Dendropsophus meridianus is a species of frog in the family Hylidae. It is endemic to southeastern Brazil.

Taxonomy
This species was first described as a subspecies of Hyla misera (now a synonym with Hyla microcephala, current name Dendropsophus microcephalus), Hyla misera meridiana, by the Brazilian herpetologist Bertha Lutz in 1954. The species status was restored in 2005 by Faivovich and colleagues, who placed Dendropsophus meridianus in their "Dendropsophus microcephalus group", along with 32 other species.

Description
Dendropsophus meridianus are small frogs: males measure  and females  in snout–vent length. The body is elongate with an angular snout. The dorsum has light orange background with a dark stripe running over the canthus rostralis and disappearing on the sides of the body. There is also a pair of similar, dark lines beginning on the interocular region. The dorsal pattern is occasionally absent or include an additional pair of dark lines over the sacrum, or dark dots and fragments. The underside is immaculate.

Habitat and conservation
This species is found on vegetation near ponds and other standing bodies of water in a range of habitats: forests, open areas, and cities. Breeding takes place in temporary ponds. It is an adaptable and very abundant species that is not threatened, although draining of its breeding sites for human settlement and mosquito control is a threat.

References

meridianus
Endemic fauna of Brazil
Amphibians of Brazil
Amphibians described in 1954
Taxa named by Bertha Lutz
Taxonomy articles created by Polbot